Der Herzensphotograph (The Heart Photographer) is a 1928 German silent film directed by Max Reichmann starring Harry Liedtke and Robert Garrison and also with La Jana and Betty Bird. The film's art direction was by Andrej Andrejew.

Cast
 Harry Liedtke as Peter, the assistant (the title character)
 Robert Garrison as Wendulin 
 La Jana as Dodo - his daughter 
 Betty Bird as Ilse, his daughter 
 Raimondo Van Riel as an adventurer
 Else Reval as Yvette 
 Edith Meinhard as Yvonne 
 Walter Kubbilun as the apprentice

References

External links

1928 films
Films of the Weimar Republic
German silent feature films
Films directed by Max Reichmann
German black-and-white films